The Carstensz expedition was made in 1936 by Anton Colijn, Jean Jacques Dozy and Frits Wissel. They left on October 29, 1936, from Aika, a town on the southern coast of Dutch New Guinea and returned on December 24. The aim of the expedition was reached by climbing the highest peak of the Carstenzgebergte, which at the time was the snow-covered peak of Ngga Pulu (then about 4,900 m). Since 1936, massive snow melt has caused the nearby rocky spires of Carstensz Pyramid (a.k.a. Puncak Jaya) (4,882 m), which the expedition was unable to climb, to become the highest summit.

Dozy was the geologist of the expedition, and he discovered the Ore Mountains: the world's largest gold deposit. Because of the inhospitable area it took years before mining of the gold was started.

References
 Colijn, H.A., Naar de eeuwige sneeuw van tropisch Nederland; de bestijging van het Carstenzgebergte in Nederlandsch Nieuw-Guinee. Amsterdam: Scheltens & Giltay, 1937 (5e druk: 1949).

External links
 Beeldverslag Carstensz-expeditie 1936
 Photo of Mount carstensz 2011

Gold mining
History of New Guinea
1936 in science
Exploration of Southeast Asia